Jayshree Soni is an Indian actress who appears in Hindi TV serials, comedy shows and movies. She began her acting career in the Pogo sitcom Sunaina in 2008. She subsequently appeared in Ek Safar Aisa Kabhi Socha Na Tha,. Agnipareeksha Jeevan Ki – Gangaa (2010). and  Rishton Ke Bhanwar Mein Uljhi Niyati (2011). 

Jayshree made her Bollywood debut with MSG: The Messenger.

Television

References

External links
 
 

Living people
Rajasthani people
Actresses in Hindi television
Indian film actresses
Indian television actresses
Actresses from Jaipur
Year of birth missing (living people)